Paul Todd Makler Jr. (born January 8, 1946) is an American Olympic saber and épée fencer.

Early and personal life
He was born in Philadelphia, Pennsylvania, later lived in Merion, Pennsylvania, and is Jewish. After college, he attended and in 1972 graduated from the University of Pennsylvania Medical School. He is the son of Paul Makler Sr. who fenced for the United States at the 1952 Summer Olympics. His brother Brooke Makler fenced at the 1976 Summer Olympics.

Fencing career
His fencing club is Salle Csiszar.

Makler fenced at the University of Pennsylvania (class of 1968) for the University of Pennsylvania Quakers.  He was NCAA individual saber champion in both 1967 and 1968, and was a first-team All-American both years.

He competed in the team épée event at the 1972 Summer Olympics in Munich at the age of 26.

References

External links
 

1946 births
Living people
American male sabre fencers
American female épée fencers
Olympic fencers of the United States
Fencers at the 1972 Summer Olympics
Fencers from Philadelphia
Sportspeople from Montgomery County, Pennsylvania
People from Lower Merion Township, Pennsylvania
Jewish male épée fencers
Jewish male sabre fencers
Jewish American sportspeople
University of Pennsylvania alumni
Perelman School of Medicine at the University of Pennsylvania alumni
American physicians
Penn Quakers fencers
21st-century American Jews